Big Bang is the fifth studio album by Brazilian rock band Os Paralamas do Sucesso. It was released in November 20, 1989.

Main hits of this album include "Lanterna dos Afogados" (one of the band's most well-known songs), "Nebulosa do Amor" and "Jubiabá" (a Portuguese-language adaptation of Alan Robert's and Lord Kitchner's "Give Me the Things").

Covers
Portuguese gothic metal band Moonspell covered "Lanterna dos Afogados" for their 2017 album 1755.

Track listing

Personnel
Os Paralamas do Sucesso
 Bi Ribeiro — bass
 Herbert Vianna — guitar, vocals
 João Barone — drums, percussion, vocals in "Rabicho do Cachorro Rabugento" and "Cachorro na Feira"

1989 albums
EMI Records albums
Os Paralamas do Sucesso albums